Guzmán Rodríguez Ferrari (born 8 February 2000) is a Uruguayan footballer who plays as a defender for Primera División club Boston River.

References

2000 births
Living people
Uruguayan footballers
Uruguayan Primera División players
Club Atlético River Plate (Montevideo) players
Association football defenders